Dorothy Walcott Weeks (May 3, 1893 – June 4, 1990) was an American mathematician and physicist. Weeks was born in Philadelphia, Pennsylvania. She earned degrees from Wellesley College, the Massachusetts Institute of Technology, and Simmons College. Weeks was the first woman to receive a PhD in Mathematics from the Massachusetts Institute of Technology.

Early life 
Dorothy Walcott Weeks was born on May 3, 1893 in Philadelphia, Pennsylvania to Mary (nee Walcott) and Edward Mitchell Weeks, an engraver. Weeks was the second of three children, born after her older brother and before her younger sister Ruth. The family moved in 1900 from Cheltenham to Washington, DC, where Weeks studied at Western High School.

Education 
Weeks graduated Phi Beta Kappa from Wellesley College in 1916. After graduation, Weeks went on to work as a teacher, a statistical clerk, and an assistant at the National Bureau of Standards. In 1917 she the third woman to work as a patent examiner at the US Patent Office. 

In 1920 Weeks worked as a lecturer at the Massachusetts Institute of Technology and earned a Master's degree in physics from that same institution in 1923. In 1924 she obtained a second master's degree, from the Prince School of Business at Simmons College, and became an employment supervisor for Jordan Marsh, the Boston department store. But by 1928, she had returned to academia, teaching physics at Wellesley College while working on her doctorate at the Massachusetts Institute of Technology.

In 1930, Weeks completed a PhD in theoretical physics from the mathematics department at the Massachusetts Institute of Technology. Her dissertation work was guided by Norbert Wiener and published in the Journal of Mathematics and Physics.

Career 
Following completion of graduate studies, Weeks developed and led the physics department at Wilson College in Chambersburg, Pennsylvania from 1930-1956. Weeks left Wilson on sabbatical from 1943 to 1945, when she worked as a technical aide at the Office of Scientific Research and Development. Later, in 1949–50, Weeks was a Guggenheim Fellow at the Massachusetts Institute of Technology. While at Wilson in the 1940s, Weeks organized six summer sessions in which undergraduate women traveled to the Massachusetts Institute of Technology to work with George R. Harrison in the spectroscopy laboratory on compiling wavelength tables. Harrison referred to this as the "Charm School." Among the undergraduate students who participated was Katherine Sopka.

From 1956 through 1964, Weeks was a physicist at the Watertown Arsenal and the technical representative for the Committee on Radioactive Shielding. In 1964, she worked for the NASA supported Solar Satellite Project at the Harvard College Observatory. From 1966 to 1971 Weeks worked as a lecturer in physics at the Newton College of the Sacred Heart. She would continue to work at Harvard as a spectroscopist, studying solar satellites at the Harvard College Observatory until she retired in 1976 at the age of eighty-three.

Weeks died on June 4, 1990 at Newton-Wellesley Hospital in Newton, Massachusetts due to a stroke.

Publications 

 Dorothy W. Weeks, "Three Mathematical Methods of Analyzing Polarized Light," Journal of Mathematics and Physics, Volume 13, Issue 4, (December 1934): 371-379. 
 Dorothy W. Weeks, "A study of sixteen coherency matrices," Journal of Mathematics and Physics, Volume 13, Issue 4, (December 1934): 380-386.
 Henry Norris Russell, Charlotte E. Moore, and Dorothy W. Weeks, "The Arc Spectrum of Iron (Fe 1)," Transactions of the American Philosophical Society, New Series, Philadelphia: American Philosophical Society, (1944).
 Dorothy W. Weeks, "Central Pennsylvania Section," American Journal of Physics, Volume 22, Number 3 (March 1954): 148-151.
 Dorothy W. Weeks, "Central Pennsylvania Section," American Journal of Physics, Volume 22, Number 6 (September 1954): 424-426.
 Dorothy W. Weeks, "Women in Physics Today," Physics Today, Volume 13, Issue 8, (1960): 22-23.
 Dorothy W. Weeks, "Absorption Spectrum of Fe I in the Vacuum Ultraviolet," Astronomical Journal, Volume 70 (1965): 696.
 Dorothy W. Weeks, "Women in Physics," Physics Today, Volume 40, Issue 6 (1987): 15.

References

External links 

 Oral history interview with Dorothy Weeks on 19 July 1978, Niels Bohr Library & Archives, American Institute of Physics

20th-century American physicists
American physicists
American women physicists
Wellesley College alumni
Massachusetts Institute of Technology School of Science alumni
1893 births
Simmons University alumni
1990 deaths
Women mathematicians
Mathematicians from Philadelphia
Harvard College Observatory people
20th-century American women
Newton College of the Sacred Heart faculty